The sixth season of the American television comedy series The Goldbergs premiered on ABC on September 26, 2018. The season is produced by Adam F. Goldberg Productions, Happy Madison Productions, Doug Robinson Productions, and Sony Pictures Television, and the executive producers are Adam F. Goldberg, Doug Robinson, and Seth Gordon. The season concluded on May 8, 2019 and consists of 23 episodes.

The show explores the daily lives of the Goldberg family, a family living in Jenkintown, Pennsylvania in the 1980s. Beverly Goldberg (Wendi McLendon-Covey), the overprotective matriarch of the Goldbergs is married to Murray Goldberg (Jeff Garlin). They are the parents of three children, Erica (Hayley Orrantia), Barry (Troy Gentile), and Adam (Sean Giambrone).

ABC renewed The Goldbergs for its fifth and sixth seasons in May 2017.

On May 11, 2019, ABC renewed The Goldbergs for a seventh season.

Cast

Main cast
 Wendi McLendon-Covey as Beverly Goldberg
 Sean Giambrone as Adam Goldberg
 Troy Gentile as Barry Goldberg
 Hayley Orrantia as Erica Goldberg
 Sam Lerner as Geoff Schwartz
 George Segal as Albert "Pops" Solomon
 A.J Michalka as Lainey Lewis (first eleven episodes)
 Jeff Garlin as Murray Goldberg

Recurring cast
 Alison Rich as Erica "Valley Erica" Coolidge

Episodes

Ratings

References

The Goldbergs (2013 TV series) seasons
2018 American television seasons
2019 American television seasons